Palma Sola Botanical Park is a botanical garden located at 9800 17th Avenue N.W. Bradenton, Florida, United States. The park showcases collections of rare palms, fruits, and flowering trees, as well as three lakes, a butterfly garden, gazebo, and pavilion. It is open daily without charge.

Overview
The park began in 1990 when a group organized to save the Manatee County palm nursery by turning it into a botanical garden. In 1993 a non-profit foundation was formed, which in 1996 agreed with Manatee County Government to establish the Palma Sola Botanical Park. Today's park is a joint venture between the Manatee County parks department and the nonprofit Palma Sola Botanical Park Foundation.

See also 
 Palma Sola, Florida
 List of botanical gardens in the United States

External links 

 Palma Sola Botanical Park

Arboreta in Florida
Botanical gardens in Florida
Parks in Manatee County, Florida